Boavita is a town and municipality in the Colombian Department of Boyacá, part of the subregion of the Northern Boyacá Province. The municipality borders Capitanejo, Santander, and the Nevado River in the north, San Mateo and La Uvita in the east, Tipacoque and Soatá in the west and Susacón in the south.

Etymology 
The name of Boavita is derived from Chibcha and doesn't mean "good life", yet "Point on the hill worshipping the Sun" or "Gate of the Sun".

History 
The area of modern Boavita in the times before the Spanish conquest of the Muisca was inhabited by a tribe called "Guavitas", pertaining to the Laches and Muisca. It was ruled by a cacique who was loyal to the Tundama of Tundama.

Modern Boavita was founded on February 9, 1613, by Sr. Hugarte.

Economy 
Main economical activities of Boavita are agriculture, livestock farming and mining. Main agricultural products cultivated are dates, sugarcane, yuca, coffee, cotton, potatoes, maize, chick peas, beans, peas, wheat and arracacha. The mining activities exist of carbon exploitation.

Gallery

References 

Municipalities of Boyacá Department
Populated places established in 1613
1613 establishments in the Spanish Empire
Muisca Confederation
Muysccubun